Francisco Cuenca Rodríguez (born 1969) is Spanish politician, member of the Spanish Socialist Workers' Party (PSOE), and mayor of Granada from 2016 to 2019. He became mayor after his predecessor, José Torres Hurtado from the opposing Partido Popular, resigned amid a corruption scandal. He is the current mayor of Granada since 2021.

Early life
Cuenca was born in Granada in 1969 and is from the Chana neighborhood of the city. He holds an undergraduate degree in Physical Education from the Universidad de Granada, and a master's degree in “Alta Dirección de Entidades Sociales.” He is the nephew of Juan Cuenca, a well-known Spanish socialist who died in 2007. He is the father of two children.

Career
Cuenca has been the spokesman for the local branch of the PSOE since 2011. In 2016 he became the mayor of Granada. He is the sixth member of the party to serve as mayor of Granada.

References

Living people
Mayors of Granada
1969 births
People from Granada
Spanish Socialist Workers' Party politicians